The 2018 Unibet Premier League Darts was a darts tournament organised by the Professional Darts Corporation – the fourteenth edition of the tournament. The event began on Thursday 1 February at the 3Arena in Dublin and ended with the play-offs at The O2 Arena in London on Thursday 17 May. This was the first year that the tournament is sponsored by Unibet.

Michael van Gerwen won his fourth Premier League title (and his third in a row, after winning in 2016 and 2017) by defeating Michael Smith 11–4 in the final.

This was also the first time that the event has had a round in Germany, when the Mercedes-Benz Arena in Berlin hosted the 4th round on 22 February.

Storm Emma resulted in the Exeter round of the event being postponed on 1 March. This was the first time ever since the Premier League started in 2005 that a whole round in the league phase of Premier League Darts was postponed. The same extreme conditions would also go on to cause severe problems in the staging of that weekends UK Open in Minehead which resulted in the event having to be played entirely behind closed doors. In 2010, the play-offs were postponed for 24 hours after a power cut at Wembley Arena.

Format
The tournament format was identical to that since 2013. During the first nine weeks (Phase 1) each player played the other nine players once. The bottom two players were then eliminated from the competition. In the next six weeks (phase 2) each player played the other seven players once. Phase 2 consisted of four weeks where five matches were played followed by two weeks where four matches were played. At the end of phase 2, the top four players contested the two semi-finals and the final in the play-off week.

Venues

Players
The players in this year's tournament were announced following the 2018 PDC World Darts Championship final on 1 January, with the top four of the PDC Order of Merit joined by six Wildcards. This was the first time in the event's history in which Phil Taylor did not take part, following his decision to retire. Unlike in previous years the six wildcards were joint decisions by the PDC and Sky Sports this year. There were no PDC specific wildcards or Sky Sports specific wildcards.

The tournament was noteworthy for its high-number of debuting players. Rob Cross qualified by right due to being in the world's top four at the end of the season, with wildcards going to World Grand Prix champion Daryl Gurney, Champions League winner Mensur Suljović, and world number 12 Gerwyn Price. In fact, only four of the previous year's ten players (van Gerwen, Wright, Anderson and van Barneveld) were included this year.

Prize money 
The prize fund remained the same as last year, £825,000.

League stage

1 February – week 1 (Phase 1)
 3Arena, Dublin

8 February – week 2 (Phase 1)
 Motorpoint Arena, Cardiff

15 February – week 3 (Phase 1)
 Metro Radio Arena, Newcastle

22 February – Week 4 (Phase 1)
 Mercedes-Benz Arena, Berlin

1 March – Initial Week 5 Cancelled
 Westpoint Arena, Exeter

The scheduled 5th week was cancelled due to Storm Emma. The matches, which were scheduled to be played that day, were instead played in Week 9 in Liverpool, with that week's games now being Judgement Night. In order to complete the schedule within the timescale, two rounds of Phase 2 were played on Wednesday 18 April and Thursday 19 April (Week 11) in the Rotterdam Ahoy complex.

8 March – Week 5 (Phase 1)
 First Direct Arena, Leeds

15 March – Week 6 (Phase 1)
 Motorpoint Arena, Nottingham

22 March – Week 7 (Phase 1)
 SSE Hydro, Glasgow

29 March – Week 8 (Phase 1)
 SSE Arena, Belfast

5 April – Week 9 (Phase 1 – Judgement  Night) 
 Echo Arena, Liverpool

The night was overshadowed by the sudden death of 5 time World Champion Eric Bristow, who suffered a heart attack outside the venue. His death was announced during the Gurney v Wright match. The crowd paid tribute to Bristow at the end of the night's play.

12 April – week 10 (Phase 2)
 FlyDSA Arena, Sheffield

18 April – week 11A (Double Header, Phase 2)

 Rotterdam Ahoy, Rotterdam

19 April – week 11B (Double Header, Phase 2)
 Rotterdam Ahoy, Rotterdam

26 April – week 12 (Phase 2)
 Manchester Arena, Manchester

3 May – week 13 (Phase 2)
 Arena Birmingham, Birmingham

10 May – week 14 (Phase 2)
 BHGE Arena, Aberdeen

Play-offs – 17 May

 The O2 Arena, London

Table and streaks

Table
After the first nine weeks (phase 1), the bottom two in the table are eliminated. In the next six weeks (phase 2) the eight remaining players each play a further seven matches. The top four players then compete in the playoffs.

Two points are awarded for a win and one point for a draw. When players are tied on points, leg difference is used first as a tie-breaker, after that legs won against throw and then tournament average.

{| class="wikitable sortable" style="text-align:center;"
|-
! rowspan=2 style="width:10px;" abbr="Position"|#
! rowspan=2 width=200 |Name
! colspan=5 | Matches
! colspan=4 | Legs
! colspan=6 | Scoring

|-
! style="width:20px;" abbr="Played"|Pld
! style="width:20px;" abbr="Won"|W
! style="width:20px;" abbr="Drawn"|D
! style="width:20px;" abbr="Lost"|L
! style="width:20px;" abbr="Points|Pts
! style="width:20px;" abbr="Legs for"|LF
! style="width:20px;" abbr="Legs against"|LA
! style="width:20px;" abbr="Leg difference"|+/-
! style="width:20px;" abbr="Legs won against throw"|LWAT
! style="width:20px;" abbr="Tons"|100+
! style="width:20px;" abbr="140 Plus"|140+
! style="width:20px;" abbr="Maximums"|180s
! style="width:20px;" abbr="Average"|A
! style="width:20px;" abbr="High checkout"|HC
! style="width:20px;" abbr="Checkout percentage"|C%

|- style="background:#ccffcc;"
!1
|align=left|  W || 16 || 11 || 1 || 4 ||23|| 103 || 60 || +43 || 38 || 192 || 128 || 56 || 103.56 || 170 || 45.37%
|- style="background:#ccffcc;"
!2
|align=left|  RU || 16 || 9 || 2 || 5 ||20|| 90 || 66 || +24 || 37 || 157 || 119 || 41 || 95.21 || 160 || 42.45%
|- style="background:#ccffcc;"
!3
|align=left|   || 16 || 8 || 3 || 5 ||19|| 95 || 80 || +15 || 33 || 205 || 114 || 57 || 99.11 || 170 || 42.04%
|- style="background:#ccffcc;"
!4
|align=left|   || 16 || 8 || 3 ||5||19|| 87 || 82 || +5 || 32 || 192 || 103 || 54 || 97.33 || 144 || 44.85%
|- style="background:#cccffc;"
!5
|align=left|   || 16 || 4 || 8 || 4 ||16|| 89 || 88 || +1 || 32 || 195 || 132 || 67 || 96.77 || 167 || 38.70%
|- style="background:#cccffc;"
!6
|align=left|  || 16 || 6 || 4 || 6 ||16|| 80 || 88 || –8 || 27 || 215 || 131 || 42 || 95.01 || 167 || 38.28%
|- style="background:#cccffc;"
!7
|align=left|   || 16 || 4 || 6 || 6 ||14|| 74 || 94 || –20 || 27 || 226 || 142 || 31 || 96.17 || 132 || 39.78%
|- style="background:#cccffc
!8
|align=left|   || 16 || 5 || 3 || 8 ||13|| 74 || 92 || –18 || 26 || 169 || 105 || 43 || 92.77 || 164 || 37.00%
|- style="background:#fcc;"
!9
|align=left|   || 9 || 2 || 0 || 7 ||4|| 40 || 53 || –13 || 12 || 153 || 87 || 14 || 99.06 || 138 || 44.44%
|- style="background:#fcc;"
!10
|align=left|   || 9 || 0 || 2 || 7 ||2|| 32 || 61 || –29 || 12 || 112 || 53 || 11 || 89.67 || 148 || 32.99%

Top four will qualify for the Play-offs after Week 14.
NB: LWAT = Legs won against throw. 
A = Average.
C% = Checkout percentage.
HC = High checkout.

Streaks

Positions by Week

References

External links
 PDC Professional Darts Corporation, official website
 PDC Professional Darts Corporation, official website, Tournaments

Premier League Darts
Premier League
Premier League